The Euboean League (to koinon tōn Euboieōn) was a federal league (koinon) of the cities of Euboea in ancient Greece, extant from the 3rd century BC to the 2nd or 3rd century AD.

The League is first attested during the reign of Demetrios Poliorketes (r. 294–288 BC), but is not mentioned again until from 194 BC on. Based on its coinage, it survived until well into the Roman Empire, possibly as late as the provincial reorganization under Diocletian (r. 284–305). It was a full federation (sympoliteia) of city-states, with its own boule and ecclesia, federal laws, common coinage (although the member cities continued to mint their own coins), and the right to grant proxenia. The League was headed by an official called hegemon, whose name featured on federal coinage.

References

Sources

Further reading
 

Ancient Euboea
Greek city-state federations
States and territories established in the 3rd century BC
States and territories disestablished in the 3rd century